The Royal United Hospital (RUH) is a major acute-care hospital in the Weston suburb of Bath, England, which lies approximately  west of the city centre. The hospital has 565 beds and occupies a  site. It is the area's major accident and emergency hospital, with a helicopter landing point on the adjacent Lansdown Cricket Club field. The hospital is operated by the Royal United Hospitals Bath NHS Foundation Trust.

History

Founding
The Royal United Hospital takes its name from the union of the Bath Casualty Hospital founded in 1788, and the Bath City Dispensary and Infirmary founded in 1792. The Casualty Hospital was founded in response to the serious injuries sustained to labourers working on the buildings which were being constructed in the city. The Dispensary and Infirmary developed from the Bath Pauper Scheme, a charity founded in 1747 to provide medical treatment for destitute persons in Bath.

The combined institution opened in a building designed by John Pinch the elder in Beau Street as the Bath United Hospital in 1826. It was awarded the title "Royal" by Queen Victoria in 1864 when a new wing, named the Albert Wing after the recently deceased Prince Consort, opened.  This building was later occupied by Bath College.

Combe Park site

The hospital moved to its present site, Combe Park, on 11 December 1932. The site had previously been used for the large First World War Bath War Hospital, which opened in 1916. In November 1919, it was renamed the Bath Ministry of Pensions Hospital, which it remained until it closed in 1929.

The site was also used by the Forbes Fraser Hospital and the Bath and Wessex Orthopaedic Hospital, both founded in 1924 and which merged into the RUH about 1980. The former manor house on the site, originally medieval but remodelled in the 18th century, became an administrative building. The building is a Grade II* listed building due to its fine Adam style interior.

In 1959, the hospital absorbed the Ear Nose and Throat Hospital and in 1973, the Bath Eye Infirmary, both located elsewhere in Bath.

In July 2011, the Dyson Centre for neonatal care opened for premature babies. Over half of the £6.1million cost was raised by the hospital's charity, the Forever Friends Appeal.

2014 redevelopment
In 2008, plans were revealed for a £100M redevelopment of the pre-Second World War RUH North buildings, which would include an increase in single-occupancy rooms in line with Government targets. In 2014, a five-year £110M development plan was confirmed; it included a new cancer centre, pharmacy, integrated therapies unit, pathology block, IT centre and 400 extra public car parking spaces.

Royal National Hospital for Rheumatic Diseases 
In 2015 and 2016, some services were transferred from the Royal National Hospital for Rheumatic Diseases to the RUH, including endoscopy and children's services, following that hospital's takeover by the RUH Trust. Construction started on a dedicated building at the RUH site in November 2017. The last rheumatic diseases services were transferred to the RUH site in autumn 2019.

Sulis Hospital, Peasedown 
The hospital was built in 2010 by Circle Health and bought by the NHS in 2021.

Services
The hospital provides acute treatment and care (including Accident & Emergency) for a catchment population of around 500,000 people in Bath and the surrounding towns and villages in North East Somerset and west Wiltshire. The hospital provides healthcare to the population served by three clinical commissioning groups (CCG): Bath and North East Somerset, Swindon and Wiltshire CCG; Bristol, North Somerset and South Gloucestershire CCG; and Somerset CCG.

The Avon and Wiltshire Mental Health Partnership offers services at Hillview Lodge on the north of the site and at Bath NHS House to the south of the site.

See also
 Healthcare in Somerset
 List of hospitals in England

References

External links

 
 
 Medical Heritage — RUH Bath

Hospital buildings completed in 1826
Hospitals established in 1932
NHS hospitals in England
Hospitals in Somerset
Buildings and structures in Bath, Somerset
1826 establishments in England